El Espino de Santa Rosa is a town in the Veraguas province of Panama.

Sources 
World Gazeteer: Panama – World-Gazetteer.com

Populated places in Veraguas Province